Richard Barnes (born July 17, 1954) is a men's college basketball head coach for the Tennessee Volunteers of the Southeastern Conference (SEC). Barnes coached the Texas Longhorns from 1998 to 2015, taking the team to the NCAA Division I men's basketball tournament in 16 of his 17 seasons, including 14 straight from 1999 to 2012, as well as a Final Four appearance led by T. J. Ford in 2003. Barnes previously coached at George Mason University, Providence College, and Clemson University. He has an overall record of 25–26 (.490) in the NCAA tournament (including 19–16 while at Texas).

Early life
Barnes was born on July 17, 1954 and grew up in Hickory, North Carolina. He is a 1977 graduate of Lenoir-Rhyne College where he was a member of the men's basketball team.

Coaching career
Barnes served as an assistant under Eddie Biedenbach at Davidson for two seasons and one with Wimp Sanderson at Alabama.

Prior to coaching at Texas, Barnes coached at George Mason, Providence, and Clemson. Barnes advanced to three NCAA tournaments at Providence and three consecutive at Clemson before leaving for Texas in 1998. Barnes won his first post-season conference tournament championship in 1994, while at Providence. At Clemson, his Tigers spent one week of the 1996–97 season ranked second in the AP Poll, the highest ranking in school history.

Texas
Barnes was hired by Texas in April 1998, and the basketball program immediately displayed his impact. Despite playing with just seven scholarship players for the majority of the 1998–99 season and opening the season with a 3–8 record, the Longhorns won 16 of their final 21 games, winning the regular season Big 12 conference championship by a two-game margin, and finishing the year at 19–13 and qualifying for the NCAA Tournament.

Barnes' success at Texas, a traditional football powerhouse, sparked interest in college basketball at the university and throughout the state. At Texas, Barnes won a school-record 402 games and transformed the school into one of the top college basketball programs in the nation. He guided the Longhorns to 16 NCAA tournament appearances. They reached the Final Four in 2003, their first in over 50 years, and advanced to the Elite Eight in 2006 and 2008. He also led Texas to their first #1 ranking in 2010, and led the Longhorns to the first 30-win seasons in school history. He coached two national players of the year: T. J. Ford (2003) and Kevin Durant (2007). He also won four Big 12 Coach of the Year awards (1999, 2003, 2008, 2014) during his time in Austin, establishing himself as a nationally regarded coach. He was fired in 2015 after Texas failed to advance to the Sweet 16 for the seventh straight season.

Tennessee
Barnes was hired by the Tennessee Volunteers in 2015. He was the Vols' third coach in as many seasons. Cuonzo Martin had left for California after the 2013–14 season; his successor, Donnie Tyndall, had been fired after just one season for lying about NCAA violations at his previous stop, Southern Mississippi.

Barnes increased the Vols' win total in each of his first four seasons. In 2018, he was named Southeastern Conference Coach of the Year after leading the Volunteers to a share of their first regular-season SEC title in a decade and a spot in the conference championship game, earning his sixth-career conference coach of the year award.

In 2018–19, he was named the Naismith College Coach of the Year after the Vols finished 31–6 (tying a school record for wins in a season) and reached the Sweet 16 of the NCAA Tournament. They were ranked No. 1 for several weeks during the season, only the second time that the Vols have been ranked that high.

Personal life
He has two children with his wife Candy. His son is a missionary overseas. His daughter Carley lives in Texas. 

In 2007, Barnes made a cameo appearance in the NBC television series Friday Night Lights as a recruiter for the fictional school TMU.

Head coaching record

See also
 List of college men's basketball coaches with 600 wins
 List of NCAA Division I Men's Final Four appearances by coach

References

External links

 Tennessee Volunteers bio
 Texas Longhorns bio

1954 births
Living people
Alabama Crimson Tide men's basketball coaches
American men's basketball coaches
American men's basketball players
Basketball coaches from North Carolina
Basketball players from North Carolina
Clemson Tigers men's basketball coaches
College men's basketball head coaches in the United States
Davidson Wildcats men's basketball coaches
George Mason Patriots men's basketball coaches
Lenoir–Rhyne Bears men's basketball players
Ohio State Buckeyes men's basketball coaches
People from Hickory, North Carolina
Providence Friars men's basketball coaches
Tennessee Volunteers basketball coaches
Texas Longhorns men's basketball coaches